Bass Player is the debut album by New Zealand reggae band, Rhombus. It was released in 2002. The album peaked at #18 in the New Zealand Top 40 Albums charts. The song "Clav Dub" reached #16 in the New Zealand Top 40 Singles charts.

Track listing
"Onwards (Step It Up)"
"Pushing Blocks"
"Hiroshima Station"
"Clav Dub"
"Spaceman"
"Tour Of Outer Space"
"Bass Player"
"JP-Dub"
"Winds"
"Piano"
"Dead And Gone"
"Homeless"
"Sweetness"

Special edition CD (2003)
Onwards (Si's Club Mix)
Onwards (Si's Radio Mix)
Onwards (Onmecha Mix)
Onwards ) (Onmecha Instrumental)
Clav Dub (Dub Pie Mix)
Clav Dub x) (Steak & Mushroom Mix)
Clav Dub (Pie Sandwich Mix)
Tour of Outer Space (Theupbeats Mix)
Tour of Outer Space (Theupbeats Radio Mix)
Tour of Outer Space (Oceans Mix)

References

Rhombus (band) albums
2002 albums